Captain James Cook  (7 November 1728 – 14 February 1779) was a British explorer, cartographer and naval officer famous for his three voyages between 1768 and 1779 in the Pacific Ocean and to New Zealand and Australia in particular. He made detailed maps of Newfoundland prior to making three voyages to the Pacific, during which he achieved the first recorded European contact with the eastern coastline of Australia and the Hawaiian Islands, and the first recorded circumnavigation of New Zealand.

Cook joined the British merchant navy as a teenager and joined the Royal Navy in 1755. He saw action in the Seven Years' War and subsequently surveyed and mapped much of the entrance to the St. Lawrence River during the siege of Quebec, which brought him to the attention of the Admiralty and the Royal Society.

In these voyages, Cook sailed thousands of miles across largely uncharted areas of the globe. He mapped lands from New Zealand to Hawaii in the Pacific Ocean in greater detail and on a scale not previously charted by Western explorers. He surveyed and named features, and recorded islands and coastlines on European maps for the first time. He displayed a combination of seamanship, superior surveying and cartographic skills, physical courage, and an ability to lead men in adverse conditions.

In 1779, during Cook's third exploratory voyage in the Pacific, tensions escalated between his men and the natives of Hawaii, and an attempt to kidnap chief Kalaniʻōpuʻu lead the death of Cook. Whilst there is controversy over Cook's role as an enabler of British colonialism and the violence associated with his contacts with indigenous peoples, he left a legacy of scientific and geographical knowledge that influenced his successors well into the 20th century, and numerous memorials worldwide have been dedicated to him.

Early life and family
James Cook was born on 7 November 1728 (NS) in the village of Marton in the North Riding of Yorkshire and baptised on 14 November (N.S.) in the parish church of St Cuthbert, where his name can be seen in the church register. He was the second of eight children of James Cook (1693–1779), a Scottish farm labourer from Ednam in Roxburghshire, and his locally born wife, Grace Pace (1702–1765), from Thornaby-on-Tees. In 1736, his family moved to Airey Holme farm at Great Ayton, where his father's employer, Thomas Skottowe, paid for him to attend the local school. In 1741, after five years' schooling, he began work for his father, who had been promoted to farm manager. Despite not being formally educated he became capable in mathematics, astronomy and charting by the time of his Endeavour voyage. For leisure, he would climb a nearby hill, Roseberry Topping, enjoying the opportunity for solitude. Cooks' Cottage, his parents' last home, which he is likely to have visited, is now in Melbourne, Australia, having been moved from England and reassembled, brick by brick, in 1934.

In 1745, when he was 16, Cook moved  to the fishing village of Staithes, to be apprenticed as a shop boy to grocer and haberdasher William Sanderson. Historians have speculated that this is where Cook first felt the lure of the sea while gazing out of the shop window.

After 18 months, not proving suited for shop work, Cook travelled to the nearby port town of Whitby to be introduced to Sanderson's friends John and Henry Walker. The Walkers, who were Quakers, were prominent local ship-owners in the coal trade. Their house is now the Captain Cook Memorial Museum. Cook was taken on as a merchant navy apprentice in their small fleet of vessels, plying coal along the English coast. His first assignment was aboard the collier Freelove, and he spent several years on this and various other coasters, sailing between the Tyne and London. As part of his apprenticeship, Cook applied himself to the study of algebra, geometry, trigonometry, navigation and astronomy – all skills he would need one day to command his own ship.

His three-year apprenticeship completed, Cook began working on trading ships in the Baltic Sea. After passing his examinations in 1752, he soon progressed through the merchant navy ranks, starting with his promotion in that year to mate aboard the collier brig Friendship. In 1755, within a month of being offered command of this vessel, he volunteered for service in the Royal Navy, when Britain was re-arming for what was to become the Seven Years' War. Despite the need to start back at the bottom of the naval hierarchy, Cook realised his career would advance more quickly in military service and entered the Navy at Wapping on 17 June 1755.

Cook married Elizabeth Batts, the daughter of Samuel Batts, keeper of the Bell Inn in Wapping and one of his mentors, on 21 December 1762 at St Margaret's Church, Barking, Essex. The couple had six children: James (1763–1794), Nathaniel (1764–1780, lost aboard  which foundered with all hands in a hurricane in the West Indies), Elizabeth (1767–1771), Joseph (1768–1768), George (1772–1772) and Hugh (1776–1793, who died of scarlet fever while a student at Christ's College, Cambridge). When not at sea, Cook lived in the East End of London. He attended St Paul's Church, Shadwell, where his son James was baptised. Cook has no direct descendants – all of his children died before having children of their own.

Start of Royal Navy career

In October and November 1755, he took part in Eagle'''s capture of one French warship and the sinking of another, following which he was promoted to boatswain in addition to his other duties. His first temporary command was in March 1756 when he was briefly master of Cruizer, a small cutter attached to Eagle while on patrol.

In June 1757 Cook formally passed his master's examinations at Trinity House, Deptford, qualifying him to navigate and handle a ship of the King's fleet. He then joined the frigate HMS Solebay as master under Captain Robert Craig.

Newfoundland
During the Seven Years' War, Cook served in North America as master aboard the fourth-rate Navy vessel . With others in Pembrokes crew, he took part in the major amphibious assault that captured the Fortress of Louisbourg from the French in 1758, and in the siege of Quebec City in 1759. Throughout his service he demonstrated a talent for surveying and cartography and was responsible for mapping much of the entrance to the Saint Lawrence River during the siege, thus allowing General Wolfe to make his famous stealth attack during the 1759 Battle of the Plains of Abraham.

Cook's surveying ability was also put to use in mapping the jagged coast of Newfoundland in the 1760s, aboard . He surveyed the northwest stretch in 1763 and 1764, the south coast between the Burin Peninsula and Cape Ray in 1765 and 1766, and the west coast in 1767. At this time, Cook employed local pilots to point out the "rocks and hidden dangers" along the south and west coasts. During the 1765 season, four pilots were engaged at a daily pay of 4 shillings each: John Beck for the coast west of "Great St Lawrence", Morgan Snook for Fortune Bay, John Dawson for Connaigre and Hermitage Bay, and John Peck for the "Bay of Despair".

While in Newfoundland, Cook also conducted astronomical observations, in particular of the eclipse of the sun on 5 August 1766. By obtaining an accurate estimate of the time of the start and finish of the eclipse, and comparing these with the timings at a known position in England it was possible to calculate the longitude of the observation site in Newfoundland. This result was communicated to the Royal Society in 1767.

His five seasons in Newfoundland produced the first large-scale and accurate maps of the island's coasts and were the first scientific, large scale, hydrographic surveys to use precise triangulation to establish land outlines. They also gave Cook his mastery of practical surveying, achieved under often adverse conditions, and brought him to the attention of the Admiralty and Royal Society at a crucial moment both in his career and in the direction of British overseas discovery. Cook's maps were used into the 20th century, with copies being referenced by those sailing Newfoundland's waters for 200 years.

Following on from his exertions in Newfoundland, Cook wrote that he intended to go not only "farther than any man has been before me, but as far as I think it is possible for a man to go".

First voyage (1768–1771)

On 25 May 1768, the Admiralty commissioned Cook to command a scientific voyage to the Pacific Ocean. The purpose of the voyage was to observe and record the 1769 transit of Venus across the Sun which, when combined with observations from other places, would help to determine the distance of the Earth from the Sun. Cook, at age 39, was promoted to lieutenant to grant him sufficient status to take the command. For its part, the Royal Society agreed that Cook would receive a one hundred guinea gratuity in addition to his Naval pay.

The expedition sailed aboard , departing England on 26 August 1768. Cook and his crew rounded Cape Horn and continued westward across the Pacific, arriving at Tahiti on 13 April 1769, where the observations of the transit were made. However, the result of the observations was not as conclusive or accurate as had been hoped. Once the observations were completed, Cook opened the sealed orders, which were additional instructions from the Admiralty for the second part of his voyage: to search the south Pacific for signs of the postulated rich southern continent of Terra Australis.
Cook then sailed to New Zealand where he mapped the complete coastline, making only some minor errors. With the aid of Tupaia, a Tahitian priest who had joined the expedition, Cook was the first European to communicate with the Māori. However, at least eight Māori were killed in violent encounters. Cook then voyaged west, reaching the southeastern coast of Australia near today's Point Hicks on 19 April 1770, and in doing so his expedition became the first recorded Europeans to have encountered its eastern coastline.On 23 April, he made his first recorded direct observation of Aboriginal Australians at Brush Island near Bawley Point, noting in his journal: "... and were so near the Shore as to distinguish several people upon the Sea beach they appear'd to be of a very dark or black Colour but whether this was the real colour of their skins or the C[l]othes they might have on I know not." Endeavour continued northwards along the coastline, keeping the land in sight with Cook charting and naming landmarks as he went. On 29 April, Cook and crew made their first landfall on the continent at a beach now known as Silver Beach on Botany Bay (Kamay Botany Bay National Park). Two Gweagal men of the Dharawal / Eora nation opposed their landing and in the confrontation one of them was shot and wounded.

Cook and his crew stayed at Botany Bay for a week, collecting water, timber, fodder and botanical specimens and exploring the surrounding area. Cook sought to establish relations with the Indigenous population without success.Blainey (2020). pp. 146-57 At first Cook named the inlet "Sting-Ray Harbour" after the many stingrays found there. This was later changed to "Botanist Bay" and finally Botany Bay after the unique specimens retrieved by the botanists Joseph Banks and Daniel Solander. This first landing site was later to be promoted (particularly by Joseph Banks) as a suitable candidate for situating a settlement and British colonial outpost.After his departure from Botany Bay, he continued northwards. He stopped at Bustard Bay (now known as Seventeen Seventy) on 23 May 1770. On 24 May, Cook and Banks and others went ashore. Continuing north, on 11 June a mishap occurred when Endeavour ran aground on a shoal of the Great Barrier Reef, and then "nursed into a river mouth on 18 June 1770". The ship was badly damaged, and his voyage was delayed almost seven weeks while repairs were carried out on the beach (near the docks of modern Cooktown, Queensland, at the mouth of the Endeavour River). The crew's encounters with the local Aboriginal people were mostly peaceful, although following a dispute over green turtles Cook ordered shots to be fired and one local was lightly wounded.

The voyage then continued and at about midday on 22 August 1770, they reached the northernmost tip of the coast and, without leaving the ship, Cook named it York Cape (now Cape York). Leaving the east coast, Cook turned west and nursed his battered ship through the dangerously shallow waters of Torres Strait. Searching for a vantage point, Cook saw a steep hill on a nearby island from the top of which he hoped to see "a passage into the Indian Seas". Cook named the island Possession Island, where he claimed the entire coastline that he had just explored as British territory. 

 Return to England 
Cook returned to England via Batavia (modern Jakarta, Indonesia), where many in his crew succumbed to malaria, and then the Cape of Good Hope, arriving at the island of Saint Helena on 30 April 1771. The ship finally returned to England on 12 July 1771, anchoring in The Downs, with Cook going to Deal.

 Interlude 
Cook's journals were published upon his return, and he became something of a hero among the scientific community. Among the general public, however, the aristocratic botanist Joseph Banks was a greater hero. Banks even attempted to take command of Cook's second voyage but removed himself from the voyage before it began, and Johann Reinhold Forster and his son Georg Forster were taken on as scientists for the voyage. Cook's son George was born five days before he left for his second voyage.

Second voyage (1772–1775)

Shortly after his return from the first voyage, Cook was promoted in August 1771 to the rank of commander. In 1772, he was commissioned to lead another scientific expedition on behalf of the Royal Society, to search for the hypothetical Terra Australis. On his first voyage, Cook had demonstrated by circumnavigating New Zealand that it was not attached to a larger landmass to the south. Although he charted almost the entire eastern coastline of Australia, showing it to be continental in size, the Terra Australis was believed to lie further south. Despite this evidence to the contrary, Alexander Dalrymple and others of the Royal Society still believed that a massive southern continent should exist.

Cook commanded  on this voyage, while Tobias Furneaux commanded its companion ship, . Cook's expedition circumnavigated the globe at an extreme southern latitude, becoming one of the first to cross the Antarctic Circle on 17 January 1773. In the Antarctic fog, Resolution and Adventure became separated. Furneaux made his way to New Zealand, where he lost some of his men during an encounter with Māori, and eventually sailed back to Britain, while Cook continued to explore the Antarctic, reaching 71°10'S on 31 January 1774.

Cook almost encountered the mainland of Antarctica but turned towards Tahiti to resupply his ship. He then resumed his southward course in a second fruitless attempt to find the supposed continent. On this leg of the voyage, he brought a young Tahitian named Omai, who proved to be somewhat less knowledgeable about the Pacific than Tupaia had been on the first voyage. On his return voyage to New Zealand in 1774, Cook landed at the Friendly Islands, Easter Island, Norfolk Island, New Caledonia, and Vanuatu.

Before returning to England, Cook made a final sweep across the South Atlantic from Cape Horn and surveyed, mapped, and took possession for Britain of South Georgia, which had been explored by the English merchant Anthony de la Roché in 1675. Cook also discovered and named Clerke Rocks and the South Sandwich Islands ("Sandwich Land"). He then turned north to South Africa and from there continued back to England. His reports upon his return home put to rest the popular myth of Terra Australis.

Cook's second voyage marked a successful employment of Larcum Kendall's K1 copy of John Harrison's H4 marine chronometer, which enabled Cook to calculate his longitudinal position with much greater accuracy. Cook's log was full of praise for this time-piece which he used to make charts of the southern Pacific Ocean that were so remarkably accurate that copies of them were still in use in the mid-20th century.

Upon his return, Cook was promoted to the rank of post-captain and given an honorary retirement from the Royal Navy, with a posting as an officer of the Greenwich Hospital. He reluctantly accepted, insisting that he be allowed to quit the post if an opportunity for active duty should arise. His fame extended beyond the Admiralty; he was made a Fellow of the Royal Society and awarded the Copley Gold Medal for completing his second voyage without losing a man to scurvy. Nathaniel Dance-Holland painted his portrait; he dined with James Boswell; he was described in the House of Lords as "the first navigator in Europe". But he could not be kept away from the sea. A third voyage was planned, and Cook volunteered to find the Northwest Passage. He travelled to the Pacific and hoped to travel east to the Atlantic, while a simultaneous voyage travelled the opposite route.

Third voyage (1776–1779)

Hawaii
On his last voyage, Cook again commanded HMS Resolution, while Captain Charles Clerke commanded . The voyage was ostensibly planned to return the Pacific Islander Omai to Tahiti, or so the public was led to believe. The trip's principal goal was to locate a Northwest Passage around the American continent. After dropping Omai at Tahiti, Cook travelled north and in 1778 became the first European to begin formal contact with the Hawaiian Islands. After his initial landfall in January 1778 at Waimea harbour, Kauai, Cook named the archipelago the "Sandwich Islands" after the fourth Earl of Sandwich—the acting First Lord of the Admiralty.

North America
From the Sandwich Islands, Cook sailed north and then northeast to explore the west coast of North America north of the Spanish settlements in Alta California. He sighted the Oregon coast at approximately 44°30′ north latitude, naming Cape Foulweather, after the bad weather which forced his ships south to about 43° north before they could begin their exploration of the coast northward. He unknowingly sailed past the Strait of Juan de Fuca and soon after entered Nootka Sound on Vancouver Island. He anchored near the First Nations village of Yuquot. Cook's two ships remained in Nootka Sound from 29 March to 26 April 1778, in what Cook called Ship Cove, now Resolution Cove, at the south end of Bligh Island. Relations between Cook's crew and the people of Yuquot were cordial but sometimes strained. In trading, the people of Yuquot demanded much more valuable items than the usual trinkets that had been acceptable in Hawaii. Metal objects were much desired, but the lead, pewter, and tin traded at first soon fell into disrepute. The most valuable items which the British received in trade were sea otter pelts. During the stay, the Yuquot "hosts" essentially controlled the trade with the British vessels; the natives usually visited the British vessels at Resolution Cove instead of the British visiting the village of Yuquot at Friendly Cove.

After leaving Nootka Sound in search of the Northwest Passage, Cook explored and mapped the coast all the way to the Bering Strait, on the way identifying what came to be known as Cook Inlet in Alaska. In a single visit, Cook charted the majority of the North American northwest coastline on world maps for the first time, determined the extent of Alaska, and closed the gaps in Russian (from the west) and Spanish (from the south) exploratory probes of the northern limits of the Pacific.

By the second week of August 1778, Cook was through the Bering Strait, sailing into the Chukchi Sea. He headed northeast up the coast of Alaska until he was blocked by sea ice at a latitude of 70°44′ north. Cook then sailed west to the Siberian coast, and then southeast down the Siberian coast back to the Bering Strait. By early September 1778 he was back in the Bering Sea to begin the trip to the Sandwich (Hawaiian) Islands. He became increasingly frustrated on this voyage and perhaps began to suffer from a stomach ailment; it has been speculated that this led to irrational behaviour towards his crew, such as forcing them to eat walrus meat, which they had pronounced inedible.

Return to Hawaii
Cook returned to Hawaii in 1779. After sailing around the archipelago for some eight weeks, he made landfall at Kealakekua Bay on Hawai'i Island, largest island in the Hawaiian Archipelago. Cook's arrival coincided with the Makahiki, a Hawaiian harvest festival of worship for the Polynesian god Lono. Coincidentally the form of Cook's ship, HMS Resolution, or more particularly the mast formation, sails and rigging, resembled certain significant artefacts that formed part of the season of worship. Similarly, Cook's clockwise route around the island of Hawaii before making landfall resembled the processions that took place in a clockwise direction around the island during the Lono festivals. It has been argued (most extensively by Marshall Sahlins) that such coincidences were the reasons for Cook's (and to a limited extent, his crew's) initial deification by some Hawaiians who treated Cook as an incarnation of Lono. Though this view was first suggested by members of Cook's expedition, the idea that any Hawaiians understood Cook to be Lono, and the evidence presented in support of it, were challenged in 1992.

Death

After a month's stay, Cook attempted to resume his exploration of the northern Pacific. Shortly after leaving Hawaii Island, however, Resolutions foremast broke, so the ships returned to Kealakekua Bay for repairs.

Tensions rose, and quarrels broke out between the Europeans and Hawaiians at Kealakekua Bay, including the theft of wood from a burial ground under Cook's orders. On 13 February 1779, an unknown group of Hawaiians stole one of Cook's longboats. By then the Hawaiian people had become "insolent", even with threats to fire upon them. Cook responded to the theft by attempting to kidnap and ransom the King of Hawaiʻi, Kalaniʻōpuʻu.

The following day, 14 February 1779, Cook marched through the village to retrieve the king. Cook took the king (aliʻi nui) by his own hand and led him away. One of Kalaniʻōpuʻu's favourite wives, Kanekapolei, and two chiefs approached the group as they were heading to the boats. They pleaded with the king not to go. An old kahuna (priest), chanting rapidly while holding out a coconut, attempted to distract Cook and his men as a large crowd began to form at the shore. At this point, the king began to understand that Cook was his enemy. As Cook turned his back to help launch the boats, he was struck on the head by the villagers and then stabbed to death as he fell on his face in the surf. He was first struck on the head with a club by a chief named Kalaimanokahoʻowaha or Kanaʻina (namesake of Charles Kana'ina) and then stabbed by one of the king's attendants, Nuaa. The Hawaiians carried his body away towards the back of the town, still visible to the ship through their spyglass. Four marines, Corporal James Thomas, Private Theophilus Hinks, Private Thomas Fatchett and Private John Allen, were also killed and two others were wounded in the confrontation.

Aftermath
The esteem which the islanders nevertheless held for Cook caused them to retain his body. Following their practice of the time, they prepared his body with funerary rituals usually reserved for the chiefs and highest elders of the society. The body was disembowelled and baked to facilitate removal of the flesh, and the bones were carefully cleaned for preservation as religious icons in a fashion somewhat reminiscent of the treatment of European saints in the Middle Ages. Some of Cook's remains, thus preserved, were eventually returned to his crew for a formal burial at sea.

Clerke assumed leadership of the expedition and made a final attempt to pass through the Bering Strait. He died of tuberculosis on 22 August 1779 and John Gore, a veteran of Cook's first voyage, took command of Resolution and of the expedition. James King replaced Gore in command of Discovery. The expedition returned home, reaching England in October 1780. After their arrival in England, King completed Cook's account of the voyage.

Legacy
Ethnographic collections

The Australian Museum acquired its "Cook Collection" in 1894 from the Government of New South Wales. At that time the collection consisted of 115 artefacts collected on Cook's three voyages throughout the Pacific Ocean, during the period 1768–80, along with documents and memorabilia related to these voyages. Many of the ethnographic artefacts were collected at a time of first contact between Pacific Peoples and Europeans. In 1935 most of the documents and memorabilia were transferred to the Mitchell Library in the State Library of New South Wales. The provenance of the collection shows that the objects remained in the hands of Cook's widow Elizabeth Cook, and her descendants, until 1886. In this year John Mackrell, the great-nephew of Isaac Smith, Elizabeth Cook's cousin, organised the display of this collection at the request of the NSW Government at the Colonial and Indian Exhibition in London. In 1887 the London-based Agent-General for the New South Wales Government, Saul Samuel, bought John Mackrell's items and also acquired items belonging to the other relatives Reverend Canon Frederick Bennett, Mrs Thomas Langton, H.M.C. Alexander, and William Adams. The collection remained with the Colonial Secretary of NSW until 1894, when it was transferred to the Australian Museum.

Navigation and science

Cook's 12 years sailing around the Pacific Ocean contributed much to Europeans' knowledge of the area. Several islands, such as the Hawaiian group, were encountered for the first time by Europeans, and his more accurate navigational charting of large areas of the Pacific was a major achievement. To create accurate maps, latitude and longitude must be accurately determined. Navigators had been able to work out latitude accurately for centuries by measuring the angle of the sun or a star above the horizon with an instrument such as a backstaff or quadrant. Longitude was more difficult to measure accurately because it requires precise knowledge of the time difference between points on the surface of the earth. The Earth turns a full 360 degrees relative to the sun each day. Thus longitude corresponds to time: 15 degrees every hour, or 1 degree every 4 minutes. Cook gathered accurate longitude measurements during his first voyage from his navigational skills, with the help of astronomer Charles Green, and by using the newly published Nautical Almanac tables, via the lunar distance method – measuring the angular distance from the moon to either the sun during daytime or one of eight bright stars during night-time to determine the time at the Royal Observatory, Greenwich, and comparing that to his local time determined via the altitude of the sun, moon, or stars.

On his second voyage, Cook used the K1 chronometer made by Larcum Kendall, which was the shape of a large pocket watch,  in diameter. It was a copy of the H4 clock made by John Harrison, which proved to be the first to keep accurate time at sea when used on the ship Deptfords journey to Jamaica in 1761–62. He succeeded in circumnavigating the world on his first voyage without losing a single man to scurvy, an unusual accomplishment at the time. He tested several preventive measures, most importantly the frequent replenishment of fresh food. For presenting a paper on this aspect of the voyage to the Royal Society he was presented with the Copley Medal in 1776. Cook became the first European to have extensive contact with various people of the Pacific. He correctly postulated a link among all the Pacific peoples, despite their being separated by great ocean stretches (see Malayo-Polynesian languages). Cook theorised that Polynesians originated from Asia, which scientist Bryan Sykes later verified. In New Zealand the coming of Cook is often used to signify the onset of the colonisation
which officially started more than 70 years after his crew became the second group of Europeans to visit that archipelago.

Cook carried several scientists on his voyages; they made significant observations and discoveries. Two botanists, Joseph Banks and the Swede Daniel Solander, sailed on the first voyage. The two collected over 3,000 plant species. Banks subsequently strongly promoted British settlement of Australia, leading to the establishment of New South Wales as a penal settlement in 1788. Artists also sailed on Cook's first voyage. Sydney Parkinson was heavily involved in documenting the botanists' findings, completing 264 drawings before his death near the end of the voyage. They were of immense scientific value to British botanists. Cook's second expedition included William Hodges, who produced notable landscape paintings of Tahiti, Easter Island, and other locations. Several officers who served under Cook went on to distinctive accomplishments. Bligh became known for the mutiny of his crew, which resulted in his being set adrift in 1789. He later became Governor of New South Wales, where he was the subject of another mutiny—the 1808 Rum Rebellion. George Vancouver, one of Cook's midshipmen, led a voyage of exploration to the Pacific Coast of North America from 1791 to 1794. In honour of Vancouver's former commander, his ship was named . George Dixon, who sailed under Cook on his third expedition, later commanded his own. Henry Roberts, a lieutenant under Cook, spent many years after that voyage preparing the detailed charts that went into Cook's posthumous atlas, published around 1784.

Cook's contributions to knowledge gained international recognition during his lifetime. In 1779, while the American colonies were fighting Britain for their independence, Benjamin Franklin wrote to captains of colonial warships at sea, recommending that if they came into contact with Cook's vessel, they were to "not consider her an enemy, nor suffer any plunder to be made of the effects contained in her, nor obstruct her immediate return to England by detaining her or sending her into any other part of Europe or to America; but that you treat the said Captain Cook and his people with all civility and kindness ... as common friends to mankind."

Memorials

A U.S. coin, the 1928 Hawaii Sesquicentennial half-dollar, carries Cook's image. Minted for the 150th anniversary of his discovery of the islands, its low mintage (10,008) has made this example of an early United States commemorative coin both scarce and expensive. The site where he was killed in Hawaii was marked in 1874 by a white obelisk. This land, although in Hawaii, was deeded to the United Kingdom by Princess Likelike and her husband, Archibald Scott Cleghorn, to the British Consul to Hawaii, James Hay Wodehouse, in 1877. A nearby town is named Captain Cook, Hawaii; several Hawaiian businesses also carry his name. In addition, the first Crew Dragon capsule flown by SpaceX was named for Endeavour. Another shuttle, Discovery, was named after Cook's .

The first institution of higher education in North Queensland, Australia, was named after him, with James Cook University opening in Townsville in 1970. Numerous institutions, landmarks and place names reflect the importance of Cook's contributions, including the Cook Islands, Cook Strait, Cook Inlet and the Cook crater on the Moon. Aoraki / Mount Cook, the highest summit in New Zealand, is named for him. Another Mount Cook is on the border between the U.S. state of Alaska and the Canadian Yukon territory, and is designated Boundary Peak 182 as one of the official Boundary Peaks of the Hay–Herbert Treaty. A larger-than-life statue of Cook upon a column stands in Hyde Park located in the centre of Sydney. A large aquatic monument is planned for Cook's landing place at Botany Bay, Sydney.

One of the earliest monuments to Cook in the United Kingdom is located at The Vache, erected in 1780 by Admiral Hugh Palliser, a contemporary of Cook and one-time owner of the estate. A large obelisk was built in 1827 as a monument to Cook on Easby Moor overlooking his boyhood village of Great Ayton, along with a smaller monument at the former location of Cook's cottage. There is also a monument to Cook in the church of St Andrew the Great, St Andrew's Street, Cambridge, where his sons Hugh, a student at Christ's College, and James were buried. Cook's widow Elizabeth was also buried in the church and in her will left money for the memorial's upkeep. The 250th anniversary of Cook's birth was marked at the site of his birthplace in Marton by the opening of the Captain Cook Birthplace Museum, located within Stewart Park (1978). A granite vase just to the south of the museum marks the approximate spot where he was born. Tributes also abound in post-industrial Middlesbrough, including a primary school, shopping square and the Bottle 'O Notes, a public artwork by Claes Oldenburg, that was erected in the town's Central Gardens in 1993. Also named after Cook is James Cook University Hospital, a major teaching hospital which opened in 2003 with a railway station serving it called James Cook opening in 2014.
The Royal Research Ship RRS James Cook was built in 2006 to replace the RRS Charles Darwin in the UK's Royal Research Fleet, and Stepney Historical Trust placed a plaque on Free Trade Wharf in the Highway, Shadwell to commemorate his life in the East End of London. A statue erected in his honour can be viewed near Admiralty Arch on the south side of The Mall in London. In 2002, Cook was placed at number 12 in the BBC's poll of the 100 Greatest Britons.

In 1959, the Cooktown Re-enactment Association first performed a re-enactment of Cook's 1770 landing at the site of modern Cooktown, Australia, and have continued the tradition each year, with the support and participation of many of the local Guugu Yimithirr people.

Culture
Cook was a subject in many literary creations. 

Letitia Elizabeth Landon, a popular poet known for her sentimental romantic poetry, published a poetical illustration to a portrait of Captain Cook in 1837.

In 1931, Kenneth Slessor's poem "Five Visions of Captain Cook" was the "most dramatic break-through" in Australian poetry of the 20th century according to poet Douglas Stewart.

The Australian slang phrase "Have a Captain Cook" means to have a look or conduct a brief inspection.

Cook appears as a symbolic and generic figure in several Aboriginal myths, often from regions where Cook did not encounter Aboriginal people. Maddock states that Cook is usually portrayed as the bringer of Western colonialism to Australia and is presented as a villain who brings immense social change.

 Controversy 

The period 2018 to 2021 marked the 250th anniversary of Cook's first voyage of exploration. Several countries, including Australia and New Zealand, arranged official events to commemorate the voyage, leading to widespread public debate about Cook's legacy and the violence associated with his contacts with Indigenous peoples. In the lead-up to the commemorations, various memorials to Cook in Australia and New Zealand were vandalised, and there were public calls for their removal or modification due to their alleged promotion of colonialist narratives. On 1 July 2021, a statue of James Cook in Victoria, British Columbia, Canada, was torn down following an earlier peaceful protest about the deaths of Indigenous residential school children in Canada. There were also campaigns for the return of Indigenous artefacts taken during Cook's voyages (see Gweagal shield). 

Alice Proctor argues that the controversies over public representations of Cook and the display of Indigenous artefacts from his voyages are part of a broader debate over the decolonisation of museums and public spaces and resistance to colonialist narratives. While a number of commentators argue that Cook was an enabler of British colonialism in the Pacific, Geoffrey Blainey, among others, notes that it was Banks who promoted Botany Bay as a site for colonisation after Cook's death. Robert Tombs defended Cook, arguing "He epitomized the Age of Enlightenment in which he lived," and in conducting his first voyage "was carrying out an enlightened mission, with instructions from the Royal Society to show ‘patience and forbearance’ towards native peoples".

Arms

See also
 New Zealand places named by James Cook
 Australian places named by James Cook
 European and American voyages of scientific exploration
 Exploration of the Pacific
 List of places named after Captain James Cook
 List of sea captains
 Death of Cook (paintings)

References

Notes

Citations

Bibliography
 
 
 
 
 
 
 
 
 
 
 
 
 
 
 
 
 
 
 
 
 
 
 
 
 

Further reading

 
 
 
 
 , Volume I, Volume II–III. 
 
 
 Richardson, Brian. (2005) Longitude and Empire: How Captain Cook's Voyages Changed the World (University of British Columbia Press.) .
 Sydney Daily Telegraph (1970) Captain Cook: His Artists – His Voyages The Sydney Daily Telegraph Portfolio of Original Works by Artists who sailed with Captain Cook. Australian Consolidated Press, Sydney
 Thomas, Nicholas The Extraordinary Voyages of Captain James Cook. Walker & Co., New York.  (2003)
 Uglow, Jenny, "Island Hopping" (review of Captain James Cook: The Journals, selected and edited by Philip Edwards, London, Folio Society, three volumes and a chart of the voyages, 1,309 pp.; and William Frame with Laura Walker, James Cook: The Voyages, McGill-Queen University Press, 224 pp.), The New York Review of Books, vol. LXVI, no. 2 (7 February 2019), pp. 18–20.
 
 
 Withey, Lynne. Voyages of discovery: Captain Cook and the exploration of the Pacific'' (Univ of California Press, 1989).

External links

 Captain Cook Society
 Captain Cook historic plaque, Halifax
 
 
 , a poetical illustration to Sherwin's engraving of Nathaniel Dance's portrait by Letitia Elizabeth Landon in Fisher's Drawing Room Scrap Book, 1838.

Biographical dictionaries

Journals
 The Endeavour journal (1) and The Endeavour journal (2), as kept by James Cook – digitised and held by the National Library of Australia
 The South Seas Project: maps and online editions of the Journals of James Cook's First Pacific Voyage, 1768–1771. Includes full text of journals kept by Cook, Joseph Banks and Sydney Parkinson, as well as the complete text of John Hawkesworth's 1773 Account of Cook's first voyage.
 Digitised copies of log books from James Cook's voyages at the British Atmospheric Data Centre
 
 
 
 Log book of Cook's second voyage: high-resolution digitised version in Cambridge Digital Library
 Digitised Tapa cloth catalogue held at Auckland Libraries

Collections and museums
 Cook's Pacific Encounters: Cook-Forster Collection online Images and descriptions of more than 300 artefacts collected during the three Pacific voyages of James Cook.
 Images and descriptions of items associated with James Cook at the Museum of New Zealand Te Papa Tongarewa
 
 Captain Cook Birthplace Museum Marton
 Captain Cook Memorial Museum Whitby
 Cook's manuscript maps  of the south-east coast of Australia, held at the American Geographical Society Library at UW Milwaukee.
 

 
1728 births
1779 deaths
18th-century English people
18th-century explorers
Death in Hawaii
English explorers of the Pacific
British military personnel of the French and Indian War
British navigators
British people executed abroad
Circumnavigators of the globe
English cartographers
English explorers of North America
English hydrographers
English people of Scottish descent
English sailors
Explorers of Alaska
Explorers of Antarctica
Explorers of Australia
Explorers of British Columbia
Explorers of New Zealand
Explorers of Oregon
Explorers of Washington (state)
Fellows of the Royal Society
Hydrographers
Maritime writers
People from Middlesbrough
Persons of National Historic Significance (Canada)
Recipients of the Copley Medal
Royal Navy officers
Q150 Icons
Sea captains